Zuhaitz Gurrutxaga Loiola (born 23 November 1980) is a Spanish former footballer who played as a defender.

Club career
Born in Elgoibar, Gipuzkoa, Gurrutxaga played four La Liga seasons with Real Sociedad, but was almost always a fringe player during his spell, his best output being 16 games in his first year. He made his debut in the competition on 23 January 2000 in a 1–1 away draw against Atlético Madrid, being sent off in the process.

After leaving Sociedad in the summer of 2004, following a short loan spell in the second division with Algeciras CF, Gurrutxaga resumed his career in the lower leagues, the sole exception being the 2009–10 campaign with Real Unión (24 matches, team relegation from the second tier).

Musical career
Gurrutxaga was the front man and lead singer of Van Popel, an unattached band who toured mostly within the Basque Country.

Honours
Spain U16
UEFA European Under-16 Championship: 1997

References

External links

Van Popel's website

1980 births
Living people
People from Elgoibar
Sportspeople from Gipuzkoa
Spanish footballers
Footballers from the Basque Country (autonomous community)
Association football defenders
La Liga players
Segunda División players
Segunda División B players
Tercera División players
Real Sociedad B footballers
Real Sociedad footballers
Algeciras CF footballers
Rayo Vallecano players
Real Unión footballers
SD Lemona footballers
Zamora CF footballers
SD Beasain footballers
Spain youth international footballers
Spain under-21 international footballers
Spanish musicians